Alexander Campbell Bruce (1835–1927), also known as A. C. Bruce, was an American architect based in Atlanta, Georgia.

Biography
Alexander Campbell Bruce was born in Fredericksburg, Virginia on March 16, 1835. His family moved to Nashville in 1847. He was trained in carpentry and the building trade by his father, and studied architecture.

He married Jane H. Hagan in Nashville in 1866.

He moved to Atlanta in 1879. He partnered for a time with A. F. N. Everett (1881–1937), Thomas Henry Morgan (1857-1940), and William H. Parkins (1836-1894).

Alexander Campbell Bruce died at his home in Atlanta on December 10, 1927.

Notable works
His works (on his own or with others) include:
First Congregational Church (1902), 105 Courtland St., NE Atlanta, GA (Alexander Campbell Bruce and A.F.N. Everett ), NRHP-listed
St. Nicholas Hotel, 141 Flint Ave., 300-310 Washington St., Albany, GA (Bruce & Everett), NRHP-listed
Kirkwood School (1906), 138 Kirkwood Rd. Atlanta, GA (Bruce, Everett and Hayes), also included in Kirkwood Historic District, NRHP-listed
John Brown Gordon statue (pedestal), Georgia State Capitol, Atlanta, GA (Alexander C. Bruce and McNeel Marble Works)
Hamblen County Courthouse, 511 W. 2nd North St. Morristown, TN (Bruce, A.C.), NRHP-listed
Haralson County Courthouse, Courthouse Sq. Buchanan, GA (Bruce, Alexander C.), NRHP-listed
North Avenue Presbyterian Church, 607 Peachtree Ave., NE Atlanta, GA (Bruce, Alexander Campbell), NRHP-listed
Old State Prison Building, 3 mi. (4.8 km) W of Milledgeville on GA 22 Milledgeville, GA (Bruce, Alexander C.), NRHP-listed

Many more as part of the partnership of Bruce & Morgan, which did work in Georgia, too. Including (some but not all of the NRIS ones):
Monroe County Courthouse, Courthouse Sq., Forsyth, GA (Bruce & Morgan), NRHP-listed
One or more works in Monroe Commercial Historic District (perhaps just the courthouse?) Monroe, GA (Bruce & Morgan), NRHP-listed
Newton County Courthouse, Courthouse Sq. Covington, GA (Bruce & Morgan), NRHP-listed
Oakland Cemetery, 248 Oakland Ave., SE Atlanta, GA (Bruce & Morgan), NRHP-listed
Paulding County Courthouse, Courthouse Sq. Dallas, GA (Bruce & Morgan), NRHP-listed
Talbot County Courthouse, Courthouse Sq. Talbotton, GA (Bruce & Morgan), NRHP-listed
Walton County Courthouse, Courthouse Sq. Monroe, GA (Bruce & Morgan), NRHP-listed
One or more works in Winthrop College Historic District, Along Oakland Ave. between Cherry Rd. and Stewart Ave. on the Winthrop College campus Rock Hill, SC (Bruce & Morgan), NRHP-listed

References

External links 

1835 births
1927 deaths
20th-century American architects
Architects from Atlanta
People from Fredericksburg, Virginia